Platyceps karelini is a species of snake in the family Colubridae. The species is endemic to Asia.

Geographic range
P. karelini is found in Afghanistan, Iran, Kazakhstan, Kyrgyzstan, Tajikistan, Turkmenistan, and Uzbekistan.

Description
P. karelini exhibits sexual dimorphism, with females being larger than males.

Dorsally, it is pale gray or tan, with a series of black crossbars, which are narrower than the spaces between them. Some individuals lack the crossbars, and instead have an orange vertebral stripe. Ventrally, it is whitish, pinkish, or yellowish.

Reproduction
P. karelini is oviparous.

Subspecies
There are three subspecies of P. karelini which are recognized as being valid, including the nominotypical subspecies.
Platyceps karelini chesneii 
Platyceps karelini karelini 
Platyceps karelini mintonorum 

Nota bene: A trinomial authority in parentheses indicates that the subspecies was originally described in a genus other than Platyceps.

Etymology
The specific name, karelini, is in honor of Russian naturalist Grigory Karelin. The subspecific name, mintonorum, is in honor of American herpetologist Sherman A. Minton and his wife Madge Alice Shortridge Rutherford Minton.

References

Further reading
Brandt [JF] (1838). "Note sur quatre nouvelles espèces de serpents de la côte occidentale de la mer Caspienne et de la Perse septentrionale, découvertes par M. Kareline ". Bulletin Scientifique de l'Académie Impériale des Sciences de Saint-Pétersbourg 3 (16): 241-244. (Coluber karelini, new species, p. 243). (in French and Latin).
Latifi M (1991). The Snakes of Iran. Oxford, Ohio: Society for the Study of Amphibians and Reptiles. 156 pp. . (Coluber karelini, p. 104).
Nagy ZT, Lawson R, Joger U, Wink M (2004). "Molecular phylogeny and systematics of racers, whip snakes and relatives (Reptilia: Colubridae) using mitochondrial and nuclear markers". Journal of Zoological Systematics and Evolutionary Research 42: 223-233. (Platceps karelini, new combination).
Szczerbak, Nikolai (2003). Guide to the Reptiles of the Eastern Palearctic. Malabar, Florida: Krieger Publishing. 350 pp. .

Reptiles described in 1838
Platyceps